Reina Elisenda is a railway station on the Barcelona–Vallès Line, in Sarrià, in the Sarrià-Sant Gervasi district of Barcelona. It is the northern terminus and only station of a branch line coming from Sarrià station. Since 2016, a single-track shuttle service, designated L12, links the two stations at four-minute intervals during rush hours due to the modification of Sarrià station to enhance access for persons with reduced mobility; before that, it was served as a branch line of L6.

The station was opened on a provisional basis on 5 October 1974, and on a permanent basis since 2 October 1976, and is situated under Passeig de la Reina Elisenda de Montcada. It can be accessed either from Avinguda de J.V. Foix or Carrer de la Duquessa d'Orleans. At night, it serves as the lines depot.

There are posters in the lobby of the station explaining the history of several of the antique trains used by Ferrocarrils de la Generalitat de Catalunya (FGC).

References

External links
 
 Information and photos about the station at Trenscat.com

Barcelona Metro line 12 stations
Transport in Sarrià-Sant Gervasi
Railway stations in Spain opened in 1976
Railway stations in Spain opened in 1974